Voivodeship road 105 (abbreviated DW 105) is a route in the Polish voivodeship roads network. The road is located in the north of the West Pomeranian Voivodeship, its 40 km length links Świerzno with the National Road 6 near Rzesznikowo. The road runs through three powiats: Kamień County (Gmina Świerzno), Gryfice County (Gmina Gryfice and Gmina Brojce) and Kołobrzeg County (Gmina Rymań).

Important settlements along the route

Świerzno
Gryfice
Brojce
Rzesznikowo

Route plan

References

104